Bhathigachh is a village development committee in Morang District in the Koshi Zone of south-eastern Nepal. At the time of the 1991 Nepal census it had a population of 11276. Its geographic coordinates are Latitude (width) 26°26'21.1"N (26.4392000°) and Longitude (length) 87°18'12.5"E (87.3034800°).

References

Village development committees in Morang District
Jahada, Morang